Veiel is a German surname. Notable people with the surname include:

 Albert Veiel (1806–1874), German dermatologist
 Andres Veiel (born 1959), German film director and screenwriter
 Rudolf Veiel (1883–1956), German military officer

German-language surnames

de:Veiel